Dave Rummells (born January 26, 1958) is an American professional golfer.

Born in Cedar Rapids, Iowa, Rummell was raised in West Branch, played college golf at the University of Iowa, and turned professional in 1981.

Rummells played on the PGA Tour from 1986 to 1994, and his best finish was second at the Buick Invitational of California in 1993. He twice finished in the top-10 in a major, both at the PGA Championship: fifth in 1989 and tied for sixth in 1988.

Rummells played on both the PGA Tour and Web.com Tour from  1995 to 2007. He won two events on the Web.com Tour (then the Nike Tour): the 1996 Nike South Carolina Classic and the 1997 Nike Knoxville Open. After turning 50 in 2008, he played on the Champions Tour and his best finish was in his first event: T-20 at the Regions Charity Classic in 2008.

Professional wins (2)

Nike Tour wins (2)

Results in major championships

Note: Rummells never played in The Open Championship.

CUT = missed the half way cut
WD = withdrew
"T" indicates a tie for a place

See also
1985 PGA Tour Qualifying School graduates
1990 PGA Tour Qualifying School graduates
1992 PGA Tour Qualifying School graduates
1996 Nike Tour graduates

References

External links

American male golfers
PGA Tour golfers
PGA Tour Champions golfers
Korn Ferry Tour graduates
Golfers from Iowa
Golfers from Florida
University of Iowa alumni
Sportspeople from Cedar Rapids, Iowa
Sportspeople from Greater Orlando
People from West Branch, Iowa
People from Kissimmee, Florida
1958 births
Living people